Witse is a Dutch language crime drama produced by Belgian broadcaster VRT and broadcast on their één channel. It is also shown on BVN. It was first broadcast in 2004 and was popular enough to run for nine seasons, with the final one airing in 2012. It starred Hubert Damen as the eponymous Witse, a driven inspector in the Belgian federal police based in Halle. It was one of the most popular Flemish television programmes with some 1.6 million viewers.

There are also Witse books. The first three were based on the last two episodes of each season, but since 2010 every six months a brand new story was published, written and invented by established Belgian (crime) writers, as Bob Van Laerhoven and Bart Van Lierde.

The music for Witse is composed by Steve Willaert.

External links
 Official website
 
 Bob Van Laerhoven
 Bart Van Lierde

Flemish television shows
Belgian drama television shows
2004 Belgian television series debuts
2012 Belgian television series endings
2000s Belgian television series
2010s Belgian television series
Fictional police detectives
Television shows adapted into novels
Television shows set in Belgium
Fictional characters from Flanders
Fictional Belgian police officers
Eén original programming